François Delmas (24 August 1913 – 3 March 2002) was a French politician. He was mayor of Montpellier from 1959 to 1977 and briefly a member of the National Assembly. He was also Secretary of State for the Environment in Raymond Barre's government from 1978 to 1981.

References

External links
Page on the National Assembly website

1913 births
2002 deaths
Republican Party (France) politicians
Union for French Democracy politicians
French Ministers of the Environment
Deputies of the 6th National Assembly of the French Fifth Republic
Mayors of Montpellier
Sciences Po alumni
20th-century French lawyers